Revenge is a 1985 Indian film, in the Malayalam language, directed by Crossbelt Mani and produced by Ratheesh and Sathar. The film stars Ratheesh, Sathaar, Anuradha and Balan K. Nair in the lead roles. The film has musical score by Guna Singh.

Cast
Ratheesh as Johnny
Sathaar as William
Anuradha as Susan
Balan K. Nair
Jagathi Sreekumar as Head constable Babu
Ramu
Silk Smitha as Geetha

Soundtrack
The music was composed by Guna Singh and the lyrics were written by Mankombu Gopalakrishnan.

References

External links
 

1985 films
1980s Malayalam-language films